Edvan Correia Edson do Nascimento (born 14 April 1979) is a Brazilian former football player who played as a midfielder.

Career
In 2008 Edvan was under contract with Romanian club Universitatea Cluj, for which he played 8 matches in Liga I and three in Liga II. In 2009 he played three games for Hungarian club Tököl VSK in the Nemzeti Bajnokság II, after which he returned to Romania at Silvania Șimleu Silvaniei, where he played 10 matches and scored one goal in Liga II. Edvan previously played for Santa Cruz in the Copa do Brasil.

References

External links

Living people
Brazilian footballers
FC Universitatea Cluj players
Expatriate footballers in Romania
Liga I players
Liga II players
Nemzeti Bajnokság II players
1979 births
Association football midfielders
Brazilian expatriate footballers
Expatriate footballers in Portugal
Expatriate footballers in Hungary
Expatriate footballers in Argentina
Atlético Clube de Portugal players
Santa Cruz Futebol Clube players
Serrano Football Club players
Vera Cruz Futebol Clube players
Sociedade Esportiva Decisão Futebol Clube players
Guarani Esporte Clube (CE) players
Sportspeople from Recife